Jackie English is a Canadian television host, actress, dancer, choreographer, director, filmmaker and performer.

Early life 
English was born in Toronto, Ontario. English later moved to Montreal where she graduated from McGill University in the top 5% in mechanical engineering .  After university she worked for a year at Cap Gemini Ernst & Young in Montreal as a consultant before becoming a full time performing artist

Career 
After leaving the corporate world, English became a host of TVOKids, TVOntario's after school block of children's programs, alongside Milton Barns, Mark Sykes and Nicole Stamp, and later Ryan Fields.  English appeared in live interstitial breaks between shows such as Art Attack, Arthur, Dino Dan and The Magic School Bus. During these segments she would perform original characters including Jigsaw Jill and interview noteworthy Canadians including Robert Munsch and Perdita Felician.   English also appeared in number of original TVO Kids series BOD TV, as Artbot in Artbot, Nifty Girl in Super Citizens, the mayor  in The Reading Rangers, and was the in-house choreographer for music videos.  Later English became the on-location host to in-studio hosts Kara Harun and Dalmar Abuzeid, where she reported on kids news including interviewing Chris Bosh, visiting Cirque du Soleil and the ROM. Best known was her 40 episodes of the series Jackie's School of Dance which was nominated for two A.C.T. Awards.

In 2011, English wrote and directed her first film, a one-minute short film called NIMBY which won first prize at the Toronto Urban Film Festival where judge Atom Egoyan called it "extraordinary."  She then started a film collective called The Splinter Unit which produced 8 films, including Out directed by Jeremy Lalonde, which premiered at TIFF.

In 2017 English's first feature film Becoming Burlesque, starring Shiva Negar with the support of Telefilm, premiered at Whistler Film Festival. The film was the opening film at the Canadian Film Festival  and won Best Film at the Tryon Film Festival in North Carolina  before its Canadian and American Theatrical release, followed by digital distribution in North America.  English was declared a Canadian Director To Watch by Broadway World.

As an actress, English has appeared in TV series CBC's Frankie Drake Mysteries, new Netflix Series Dare Me, Rookie Blue, and Beauty and the Beast.

As a choreographer, English created 60 episodes of TFO series Minivers, dances for Second City MainStage, I, Martin Short, Goes Home.

Filmography

Awards, festivals and nominations

References 

Actresses from Toronto
Canadian female dancers
Canadian choreographers
Film directors from Toronto
Living people
McGill University Faculty of Engineering alumni
Year of birth missing (living people)
Canadian women choreographers
Canadian women film directors